Rampant is a 2018 South Korean period action zombie film directed by Kim Sung-hoon. It was released on October 25, 2018. The film features a clash between exiled prince Lee Chung (Hyun Bin) and the Joseon minister of War Kim Ja-joon (Jang Dong-gun) with the backdrop of a spreading zombie plague. It received mixed reviews from critics and was a box office bomb, grossing $12.4 million worldwide against a production budget of $15 million.

Plot
In the Joseon dynasty, King Lee Jo is viewed as overly deferential to the nearby Qing dynasty of China. His son, Crown Prince Lee Young, plots to buy European arquebuses to drive away the Qing. The plot is exposed by War Minister Kim Ja-joon, who holds influence over the king and frames it as a rebellion. Kim meets the Europeans and learns that they have brought zombies (called "night demons"). The crown prince commits suicide as penance so that his subordinates will be spared. Joseon forces destroy the European ship and retrieve the arquebuses, but a Joseon soldier is bitten by a zombie. He returns to his village, where he turns and spreads the infection. The zombies crave human meat and blood, are attracted by sounds, repelled by sunlight, and are stopped by decapitation or piercing of the heart, as well as separation of spinal vertebrae but methods of killing are inconsistent.

The crown prince left a request that his wife Gyeong-bin and unborn child be raised by his younger brother Lee Chung in China for their safety. Lee Chung had previously been left out of Joseon's order of succession and grew up abroad in the prosperous Qing. Lee Chung returns with his companion Hak-Su, landing in Jemulpo, but is attacked by Joseon assassins sent by Minister Kim and other ministers, who are plotting a coup. The noise of the battle draws an attack by zombified villagers. Lee Chung and Hak-Su are assisted by local partisans, including Park Eul-ryoung, former lieutenant to the crown prince, and archer Deok-hee. The Jemulpo partisans ask Lee Chung to become crown prince, but he declines, wanting to return to China. Lee Chung awkwardly flirts with Deok-hee.
 
The only survivor of the would-be assassins is captured by Kim because he is infected. The ministers arrange for a concubine to be infected. She later turns and infects the king. Lee Chung arrives at the king's court, where he requests an army to crush the zombies. The king initially agrees but the ministers instigate him to rescind the order, claiming no zombie outbreak, only a civil rebellion. The Jemulpo partisans are arrested, while Lee Chung and Gyeong-bin are ordered to attend a banquet for a visiting Qing delegation.

At the banquet, the king fully turns into a zombie, and is slain by Kim, who unleashes zombies there in an attempt to kill members of the palace and the Qing delegation, then rule with all potential opposition gone. However, Kim is bitten by a zombie, leading to the ministers attempting to kill him. Kim slays them all, chops off his own hand to slow the infection, then declares himself king.

Gyeong-bin convinces Lee Chung not to flee but to protect the people, so Lee Chung, the royal guard and his Jemulpo allies freed from prison proceed to fight to prevent the zombies from escaping the palace and attacking the capital. Lee Chung and his allies plan to draw the zombies together into a gigantic fiery explosion at the palace. Kim kills Hak-Su and an infected Park, preventing the explosion. Lee Chung continues the same plan, battling a horde of zombies and the half-infected Kim. While doing so, he pours oil on the floor of the palace. Deok-hee fires a flaming arrow into the palace burning it down. Lee Chung retreats to the roof of the palace, only to find that Kim also climbed the palace.

Together, they duel with each other, Lee Chung being the victor. Reinforcements of soldiers and commoners later arrive to exterminate the rest of the zombies. Lee Chung recognizes that through the power of the people, the ruined Joseon still has hopes for existence, and elects to stay rather than go back to Qing China.

Cast

Main
 Hyun Bin as Lee Chung – the current heir to the Joseon throne, who is arrogant and only wants to marry a girl to accompany to China
 Jang Dong-gun as Kim Ja-joon – the corrupt Minister of War who leads the Royal Family into believing Lee Chung is not the heir

Supporting 
 Kim Eui-sung as King Lee Jo, the king of Joseon who delights in luxury
 Jeong Man-sik as Hak-soo, Lee Chung's quirky bodyguard 
 Jo Woo-jin as Park Eul-ryoung, one of the three protectors of Jemulpo who accompanies Chung during the virus
 Lee Sun-bin as Deok-hee, an archer and the second protector of Jemulpo who Lee Chung has a crush on
 Seo Ji-hye as Concubine Jo
 Kim Dae-gon as Royal Court Physician	
 Jo Dal-hwan as Monk Dae-gil, the third protector of Jemulpo who follows Buddhist religion
 Han Ji-eun as Royal Noble Consort Gyeong
 Heo Joon-suk 
Jung Yoo-ahn

Special appearance
 Kim Tae-woo as Crown Prince Lee Young

Production 
Principal photography began on September 1, 2017 and concluded on February 13, 2018.

The film is financed and distributed by Next Entertainment World, who was the primary backer of films such as Pandora and Train to Busan. It is directed by Kim Sung-hoon, who has worked with Hyun Bin in the hit film Confidential Assignment. On November 14, 2017, it was announced by distributor Next Entertainment World that actor Kim Tae-woo will fill the role of Crown Prince Lee Young, originally scheduled to be played by the late Kim Joo-hyuk.

Release
The film was released domestically on October 25, 2018, alongside Grass and Hollywood film Crazy Rich Asians.

The film had already lined up theatrical releases in 19 countries. Release date for Philippines, Germany, UK, Vietnam, Myanmar, Singapore, Hong Kong, Macau, Thailand, Australia, New Zealand, US, Canada, Laos, Malaysia, Indonesia, and Cambodia is set within 2 weeks after domestic release date.

Reception

Critical response
Shim Sun-ah from Yonhap News Agency gave a mixed review and wrote, "Rampant has a promising premise, but it is a bland film that is marred by a predictable plot and cardboard characters. However, the movie much to the satisfaction of fans of zombie movies, they are quick, strong and cruel, not to mention creepy. It also succeeded in giving audiences spectacular sword-fight sequences and some truly beautiful cinematography."

Park Jin-hae from The Korea Times also gave a mixed review and wrote, "Hyun's skillful action scenes with a long sword, almost singlehandedly defeating zombies endlessly swarming from all directions, are entertaining. It keeps viewers on the edge of their seats with nerve-wracking moments to the last. But the film seems to work adversely as loosening up the thrill and chills the zombies worked hard to create. Another letdown has been lack of character development."

Box office
The film recorded 156,644 admissions with  gross on its opening day, taking the box office lead from Dark Figure of Crime. On October 28, the film surpassed 1 million admissions, 4 days after its release. During its opening weekend, the film attracted 840,854 moviegoers with  gross, and finished first place at the box office. However, the film dropped 80% in gross during its second weekend, with  gross from 174,993 attendance, and finished third in the box office chart.

As of November 18, 2018, the film grossed  from 1,596,255 total attendance.

References

External links
 
 Rampant on Naver 
 Rampant on Daum 
 Rampant on Hancinema 
  Rampant on Cine 21

2018 films
2018 action thriller films
2018 horror films
2010s action horror films
2010s historical horror films
Films about princes
Films set in the Joseon dynasty
2010s Korean-language films
Next Entertainment World films
South Korean historical action films
South Korean action thriller films
South Korean action horror films
South Korean zombie films
2010s historical action films
2010s South Korean films